The South African Railways Class E 4-6-4T of 1902 was a steam locomotive from the pre-Union era in the Colony of Natal.

In 1902, the Natal Government Railways placed ten Class F  Baltic type tank steam locomotives in service.

Manufacturer
The last locomotive to be designed for the Natal Government Railways (NGR) by Locomotive Superintendent G.W. Reid before he relinquished his appointment in 1902, was a  locomotive, the first known locomotive in the world to be designed and built as a  Baltic type.

It was built for the NGR by Neilson, Reid and Company who delivered ten of them in 1902, numbered in the range from 1 to 10. In NGR service, they were known as the Neilson, Reid locomotives until a classification system was introduced at some stage between 1904 and 1908 and they were designated the NGR .

The NGR Class F was a larger version of the NGR Class H Stephenson-built  loco­mo­tive, which Reid had rebuilt from a Class G  locomotive in 1896 and which later became the sole Class C2 on the South African Railways (SAR). Many of the main dimensions were identical. They had plate frames, Stephenson valve gear and used saturated steam.

South African Railways
When the Union of South Africa was established on 31 May 1910, the three Colonial government railways (Cape Government Railways, NGR and Central South African Railways) were united under a single administration to control and administer the railways, ports and harbours of the Union. Although the South African Railways and Harbours came into existence in 1910, the actual classification and renumbering of all the rolling stock of the three constituent railways were only implemented with effect from 1 January 1912.

In 1912, these locomotives were designated Class E on the SAR roster and renumbered in the range from 87 to 96.

Service

South Africa
The locomotives were built specifically for use on the Natal South Coast and the Richmond branch, where reverse running was required due to the absence of turning facilities such as turntables or triangles. In SAR service, the Class E was mainly used for shunting work.

First World War
In 1915, shortly after the outbreak of the First World War, the German South West Africa colony was occupied by the Union Defence Forces. Since a large part of the territory's railway infrastructure and rolling stock was destroyed or damaged by retreating German forces, an urgent need arose for locomotives for use on the Cape gauge lines in that territory. In 1917, numbers 87 and 92 were transferred to the Defence Department for service in South West Africa. Both locomotives are believed to have returned to South Africa after the war.

The locomotives were later transferred to the Cape Midland System, where they remained for the rest of their service lives. They were withdrawn from service and scrapped in 1937.

References

1100
1100
4-6-4 locomotives
2C2 locomotives
4-6-4T locomotives
Neilson Reid locomotives
Cape gauge railway locomotives
Railway locomotives introduced in 1902
1902 in South Africa
Scrapped locomotives